Apateona hispanicum is a moth of the family Autostichidae and the only species in the genus Apateona. It is found in Spain.

References

Moths described in 1985
Apateona